Hunter March (born April 5, 1991) is an American television host, actor and producer, best known for his digital work with AwesomenessTV and as the host of Sugar Rush on Netflix and Emogenius on Game Show Network.

Early life
Hunter March was born on April 5, 1991. He is the grandson of Candy Toxton and Hal March.

Career

AwesomenessTV
March joined AwesomenessTV as an intern in 2012 near the inception of the company and quickly was promoted to producer then on-camera host where he became one of the early faces of the company.  He has hosted 2,000 episodes of multiple shows for AwesomenessTV and has been the permanent host of the Daily Report for over five years.

In 2015 and 2016, March hosted Top Go Yo AwesomenessTV's larger-budget daily live talk show for Verizon/Go90.

Additionally, he hosts the show You're Busted with his best friend Nick Haddad.

Game show career
March was the host of Emogenius on Game Show Network, which aired from 2017 to 2018.

Netflix's Sugar Rush
In July 2018, Netflix premiered its newest culinary competition show Sugar Rush of which Hunter March was the host. In the show judges Candace Nelson and Adriano Zumbo, along with a special celebrity guest judge that varied between episodes, judge teams of top bakers for a grand prize of $10,000 in each show.

Other hosting
In 2016, March hosted the backstage segments at the Teen Choice Awards.
Hunter is also the co-host of the E! late-night show Nightly Pop. The show was cancelled on August 26, 2022, which concluded its final airing in October.

Book
In 2017, March released "TBH" through Scholastic, a self-help book for teens featuring stories contributed by 24 different major influencers including Rebecca Black, Alex Aiono, and Jenn McAllister.  For every book sold, Scholastic is donating a book to the Pajama Program.

References

1991 births
Living people
Place of birth missing (living people)
American game show hosts
American television actors
American television producers
American YouTubers